Caerau Football Club are a Welsh football club from Maesteg. They currently play in the Bridgend & District League Premier Division. They formerly played in the Welsh Football League.

They were promoted to the Welsh Football League Division Three for the 2010–11 season from the South Wales Amateur League. In 2011–12 they gained another promotion to the Welsh Football League Division Two, but were relegated to Division Three in 2013–14. At the end of the 2018–19 season the club were relegated from the Welsh Football League and joined the South Wales Alliance League Premier Division.  They were then relegated for a second successive season at the end of the 2019–20 season, dropping to the First Division for 2020–21. They subsequently took a decision to drop out of the South Wales Alliance League and moved into tier 7, playing in the Bridgend & District League Premier Division for the 2021–22 season. They finished second from the bottom of the table.

History
Former Arsenal and England midfielder Paul Merson made one appearance for the club in October 2017.

References

External links
 FCHD Caerau Athletic
 FCHD Caerau
 FCHD Caerau United

Football clubs in Wales
1901 establishments in Wales
Association football clubs established in 1901
Association football clubs disestablished in 1929
Bridgend & District League clubs
South Wales Alliance League clubs
South Wales Amateur League clubs
South Wales League clubs
Welsh Football League clubs
Football clubs in Bridgend County Borough
Maesteg